The list of ship commissionings in 1964 includes a chronological list of all ships commissioned in 1964.


See also 

1964